Huichang County is a county, under the jurisdiction of Ganzhou, in the south of Jiangxi province, People's Republic of China.

Population
The population of Huichang is 445,137 (2010), including nations of Han (partly Hakka) and She.

Administration
Huichang has jurisdiction over 6 towns and 13 townships. The seat of the county locates at the Wenwuba Town.
6 Towns

13 Townships

Geography

Huichang is located in the southeast of Jiangxi province. The Xiang River and the Mian River merge here and form the Gong River.

Huichang has an area of 2722.18 km2.

Climate

Transport
 Ganzhou–Longyan Railway

External links
 https://web.archive.org/web/20040817062717/http://www.jxit.com.cn/chl/other/llp/

References

Ganzhou
County-level divisions of Jiangxi